De Profundis is the second album by the Polish death metal band Vader. The album was originally released in Poland by Croon Records and in the US by Pavement Music, but with no lyrics and a normal inner CD layout. It was re-released with a bonus track by Metal Mind Productions in 2003 with a cover of the Depeche Mode song "I Feel You". It was also re-released for Japan in 1997 by Avalon Records/Marquee Records with two bonus tracks.

De Profundis was recorded in May 1995 at Modern Sound Studio in Gdynia, Poland, and was produced by Piotr Wiwczarek and Adam Toczko. The album was mastered by Grzegorz Piwkowski.

A live music video was shot for the song "Incarnation" during the Marlboro Sopot Rock Festival in Poland.

The album sold approximately 17,000 units in two weeks in Poland.

Track listing

Personnel
Production and performance credits are adapted from the album liner notes.

An Act of Darkness / I.F.Y.
An Act of Darkness / I.F.Y. is the first single by the Polish death metal band Vader. It was released in 1995 by Croon Records in Poland, and System Shock/Impact Records in the rest of Europe.

Track listing

Charts

Release history

References

1995 albums
Vader (band) albums
Albums with cover art by Wes Benscoter